Lebanese Jamaicans refers to Jamaican citizens of Lebanese or partial Lebanese origin or descent. Many arrived in the 19th century, from not only modern day Lebanon, but also Syria and Palestine, having fled their homeland due to religious persecution under Ottoman rule.

Surnames

Notable people
Philip Feanny O.D, Most decorated horse trainer In the world, Master trainer/breeder
 Lady Colin Campbell, author, socialite, radio hostess
 Don Wehby, business executive
 Lisa Hanna, Miss Jamaica and Miss World 1993
 Abraham Elias Issa, businessman, entrepreneur, and hotelier
 Joseph John Issa, businessman and philanthropist
 Ken Khouri, record producer
 Anita Mahfood, dancer, actress, singer
 Shahine Fakhourie Robinson, Jamaican Labor Party politician and Member of Parliament
 Edward Zacca, former Chief Justice of the Supreme Court of Jamaica; former Governor-General
 Edward Seaga, former Prime Minister of Jamaica
 Ziadie family
 Maria Ziadie-Haddad, airline pilot

References

Arab diaspora in the Caribbean
Ethnic groups in Jamaica
 
 
Jamaica